William H. Durham, a  biological anthropologist and evolutionary biologist,  is the Bing Professor Emeritus in Human Biology at Stanford University.

Education
William Durham earned a B.S. at Stanford University in 1971, and graduated from the University of Michigan with a master’s (1973) and PhD (1977).

Career
Durham joined Stanford as a faculty member in 1977. He was a Fellow of the Center for Advanced Study in the Behavioral Sciences (1989-1990) and Stanford's Director of the human biology program (1992-1995).   He has been the Bing Professor in Human Biology, as well as a Bass University Fellow in Undergraduate Education, and a Senior Fellow in the Woods Institute for the Environment at Stanford. He is now professor emeritus.

Durham was a founding co-director of the research Center for Responsible Travel at Stanford (CREST) in 2003. In 2011, he became a co-director with Rodolfo Dirzo of the Osa-Golfito Initiative (INOGO) which works with Costa Ricans to develop sustainability strategy.

Research
Durham has studied the demography, genetics, and resource management of the San Blas Kuna of Panama, El Salvador and Honduras, and deforestation in Mexico, Central, and South America. 

Based on his work in West Africa and Latin America, Durham has developed a theory of coevolution which he uses to examine the ways in which the interactions of genetics, the environment, and human culture affect groups within human populations.

Works
Durham was Editor of the Annual Review of Anthropology from 1993–2008.
His published books include: 
 
Escasez y sobrevivencia en Centroamérica: orígenes ecológicos de la guerra del fútbol, UCA Editores, 1988, 
   (reprint 1992)

Awards
 1983, MacArthur Fellows Program
 National Science Foundation fellowship
 Guggenheim Fellowship
 Danforth Foundation fellowship

References

American anthropologists
Year of birth missing (living people)
Living people
University of Michigan College of Literature, Science, and the Arts alumni
MacArthur Fellows
Human ecologists
Stanford University alumni
Annual Reviews (publisher) editors